The 2022–23 season is the 135th competitive association football season in India. The season began in August 2022.

National teams

India national football team

Results and fixtures

Friendlies

India women's national football team

Results and fixtures

SAFF Women's Championship

AFC Club competitions

2022 AFC Cup

Inter-zone play-off semi-finals

Men's club football

Indian Super League

Regular season

Playoffs

I-League

I-League 2

State football leagues

Cup competitions

Durand Cup

Final

Super Cup

Additional play-offs for qualifications

|+AFC Champions League group stage 

|+ AFC Cup group stage

|+ AFC Cup qualifying playoff

Women's club football

Indian Women's League

Youth football

Elite League

Knockout stage

Reliance Foundation Development League

Futsal

Futsal Club Championship

Notes

References

 
Football
Football
India
India
Seasons in Indian football